Phosphatocopina (alternatively Phosphatocopida) is an extinct group of bivalved arthropods known from the Cambrian period. They are generally sub-milimetric to a few millimetres in size, and are typically found 3-dimensionally preserved in Orsten-type phosphatized preservation.

Description 
The phosphatized bivalved carapace covered the entire body. In some species, spines were present on the carapace. The head either bore a pair of stalked eyes or a pair of dome-shaped medial eyes. The first appendage pair, dubbed the "antennulae", were uniramous, with the remaining appendage pairs being biramous. The endopods of the biramous limbs had prominently developed endites, while the exopods were typically annulated, and bore setae. The earliest larval stages of phosphatocopines are known as "head larva", due to them only having the four pairs of cephalic appendages.

Ecology 
Phosphatocopines are generally thought to have been nektobenthic (swimming close to the sediment), and have been suggested to have fed on small particulate organic matter, using their limbs to trap particles. They are thought to have been tolerant of hypoxic environments.

Taxonomy 
When phosphatocopines were first described, they were suggested to be ostracods, but this was rejected after their soft tissue was described. They have often been suggested to be close relatives of crustaceans, with the proposed clade containing the two groups dubbed Labrophora. However, their mandibles and maxillae are not morphologically differentiated from the other trunk limbs, with differentiated mandibles and maxillae characterising most crown-group mandibulates, including crustaceans, and as such have been alternatively suggested to be stem-group mandibulates. Several subgroups have been proposed, such as Hesslandonidae and Vestrogothiidae.

References 

Cambrian arthropods
Arthropods
Taxa described in 1964